The Alma Grace McDonough Health and Recreation Center is a 2,200 seat multipurpose arena and recreation facility on the campus of Wheeling University in Wheeling, West Virginia.  The building was constructed thanks to a gift from Alma Grace McDonough, whom the building is named after.

The  facility is home to the university's men's and women's basketball teams, swimming teams, and the volleyball team.  In addition, the facility is home to WU's athletic training and physical therapy programs, a wellness center, fitness center, and the university alumni center.

In addition to university programs, the McDonough Center has also hosted the AIDS Memorial Quilt, and hosts an annual college fair.

References

External links
WU Athletics

Sports venues in West Virginia
College basketball venues in the United States
Indoor arenas in West Virginia
Buildings and structures in Wheeling, West Virginia
Wheeling University
Tourist attractions in Ohio County, West Virginia